Dell SupportAssist, formerly known as Dell Support Center, is a software agent provided by Dell. It is pre-installed on all Dell Consumer Desktops and Portables and Vostro Desktops and Portables.

According to the company, Dell SupportAssist is "a control panel for system tools and diagnostics. It contains extensive help sections for online tools, warranty information, Dell technical support links and Dell customer support channels. Access all system controls like Device Manager, Network Connections, etc. from a single location".

References

External links
 Dell Support Assist

Dell products